Charles Michael "Chuck" Palahniuk (born February 21, 1962) is an American novelist who describes his work as transgressional fiction. He has published 19 novels, three nonfiction books, two graphic novels, and two adult coloring books, as well as several short stories. His first published novel was Fight Club, which was adapted into a film of the same title.

Early life
Palahniuk was born in Pasco, Washington, the son of Carol Adele (née Tallent) and Fred Palahniuk. He has French and Ukrainian ancestry. His paternal grandfather migrated from Ukraine to Canada and then to New York in 1907. Palahniuk grew up living in a mobile home in Burbank, Washington. His parents separated when he was 14 years old, and they subsequently divorced, often leaving him and his three siblings to live with their maternal grandparents at their cattle ranch in eastern Washington. Palahniuk acknowledged in a 2007 interview that he is a distant nephew of actor Jack Palance, and that his family had talked of distant relations with Palance. Palahniuk attended the University of Oregon in his 20s, graduating in journalism in 1986. He interned at the local public radio station, KLCC, as part of his coursework.

Career

Early career
He wrote for the local newspaper for a short while but then began working for Freightliner Trucks as a diesel mechanic, continuing until his writing career took off. During that time, he wrote manuals on fixing trucks and had a stint as a journalist, a job to which he did not return until after he became a successful novelist. After casually attending a seminar by Landmark Education, Palahniuk quit his job as a journalist in 1988. He performed volunteer work for a homeless shelter and volunteered at a hospice as an escort, providing transportation for terminally ill people, taking them to support group meetings. He ceased volunteering upon the death of a patient to whom he had grown attached.

Palahniuk began writing fiction in his mid-30s. By his account, he started writing while attending workshops for writers that were hosted by Tom Spanbauer, which he attended to meet new friends. Spanbauer largely inspired Palahniuk's minimalistic writing style.

Fight Club
After his first novel, Invisible Monsters, was rejected by all publishers he submitted it to, he began work on his first published novel, Fight Club. Palahniuk wrote this story in his spare time while working for Freightliner. After initially publishing it as a short story (which became chapter 6 of the novel) in the 1995 compilation Pursuit of Happiness, Palahniuk expanded it into a full novel, which, contrary to his expectations, a publisher accepted. While the original hardcover edition of the book received positive reviews and some awards, it had a short shelf life.

Initially, Palahniuk struggled to find a literary agent and went without one until after the publication of Fight Club. After he began receiving attention from 20th Century Fox, Palahniuk was signed by actor and literary agent, Edward Hibbert. Hibbert eventually guided and brokered the deal that took Fight Club to the big screen. In 1999, the film adaptation by director David Fincher was released. The film was a box office disappointment (although it was No. 1 at the U.S. box office in its first weekend) and critical reaction was mixed, but a cult following soon emerged as the DVD of the film became popular upon release. Three editions of the novel have been published in paperback, in 1999, in 2004 (with a new introduction by the author about the success of the film adaptation), and in 2005 (with an afterword by Palahniuk).

Invisible Monsters, Survivor, and Choke
A revised version of Invisible Monsters, as well as his fourth novel, Survivor, were published in 1999. A few years later Palahniuk managed to make his first New York Times bestseller, the novel Choke, which later was made into a movie.

Lullaby

The year 1999 brought a series of great personal tragedies to Palahniuk's life. At that time, his father, Fred Palahniuk, had started dating a woman named Donna Fontaine, whom he had met through a personal ad under the title "Kismet". Her former boyfriend, Dale Shackelford, had previously been imprisoned for sexual abuse and had vowed to kill Fontaine as soon as he was released from prison. Palahniuk believes that, using a personal ad, Fontaine was looking for "the biggest man she could find" to protect her from Shackelford, and Palahniuk's father qualified. After his release, Shackelford followed Fontaine and the senior Palahniuk to Fontaine's home in Kendrick, Idaho, after they had gone out for a date. Shackelford then shot them both and dragged their bodies into Fontaine's cabin home, which he then set alight. In the spring of 2001, Shackelford was found guilty for two counts of murder in the first degree and sentenced to death. In the wake of these events, Palahniuk began working on the novel Lullaby. He has stated that he wrote the novel to help him cope with having participated in the decision to have Shackelford receive the death sentence.

"Guts" and Haunted
While on his 2003 tour to promote his novel, Diary, Palahniuk read to his audiences a short story entitled "Guts", a sensational tale of accidents involving masturbation, which appears in his book, Haunted. The story begins with the author telling his listeners to inhale deeply and that "this story should last about as long as you can hold your breath." It was reported that 40 people had fainted listening to the readings while holding their breath. Playboy magazine later published the story in their March 2004 issue and Palahniuk offered to let them publish another story along with it, but the publishers found the second work too disturbing to publish. On his tour to promote Stranger than Fiction: True Stories during the summer of 2004, he read "Guts" to audiences again, bringing the total number of fainters up to 53 (and later up to 60 while on tour to promote the softcover edition of Diary). In the fall of that year, he began promoting Haunted, and continued to read "Guts". In June 2005, Palahniuk noted that his number of fainters was up to 67. The last fainting occurred on May 28, 2007, in Victoria, British Columbia, Canada, where five people fainted, one of whom fell and hit his head on the door while trying to leave the auditorium. Since then audio recordings of his readings of the story have been circulated on the Internet. In the afterword of the latest edition of Haunted, Palahniuk reported that Guts had been responsible for 73 fainting events.

At a 2005 appearance in Miami, Florida, during the Haunted tour, Palahniuk commented that Haunted represented the last of a "horror trilogy" (including Lullaby and Diary). He also indicated that his then-forthcoming novel, Rant, would be the first of a "science fiction trilogy".

In 2008, Palahniuk spent a week at the Clarion West Writers Workshop, instructing eighteen students about his writing methods and theory of fiction.

Adaptations
In addition to the film, Fight Club was adapted into a fighting video game loosely based on the film, which was released in October 2004, receiving poor reviews universally. Palahniuk has mentioned at book readings that he is working on a musical based on Fight Club with David Fincher and Trent Reznor. Edward Norton has said that he thinks it is unlikely that he and Brad Pitt, who "can't sing," would reprise their film roles in a musical.

Graphic novel adaptations of Invisible Monsters and Lullaby, drawn by comic artist, Kissgz, a.k.a. Gabor, are available online.

Following the success of the movie of Fight Club, interest began to build about adapting Survivor to film. The film rights to Survivor were sold in early 2001, but no movie studio had committed to filming the novel. After the attacks on the Pentagon and World Trade Center on September 11, 2001, movie studios apparently deemed the novel too controversial to film because it includes the hijacking and crashing of a civilian airplane. In mid-2004, however, 20th Century Fox committed to adapting Palahniuk's novel. Palahniuk has said that the same people who made the film Constantine will be working on this film.

Following that, the film rights to Invisible Monsters and Diary also were sold. While little is known about some of these projects, it is known that Jessica Biel was signed on to play the roles of both Shannon and Brandy in Invisible Monsters, which was supposed to begin filming in 2004, but  was still in development.

Palahniuk helped write some of the video game Manhunt 2 in his freelance writing in 2007.

On January 14, 2008, the film version of Choke premiered at the Sundance Film Festival, starring Sam Rockwell, Kelly Macdonald and Anjelica Huston with Clark Gregg directing. David Fincher  expressed interest in filming Diary as an HBO miniseries.

On September 11, 2014, the film version of Rant was announced, starring James Franco, with Pamela Romanowsky writing and directing.

Writing style and themes

Style
Palahniuk says that his writing style has been influenced by authors such as the minimalist Tom Spanbauer (whose weekly workshop Palahniuk attended in Portland from 1991 to 1996), Amy Hempel, Mark Richard, Denis Johnson, Thom Jones, Bret Easton Ellis and philosophers Michel Foucault, Friedrich Nietzsche and Albert Camus. In what the author refers to as a minimalistic approach, his writings include a limited vocabulary and short sentences to mimic the way that an average person telling a story would speak. In an interview, he said that he "prefers to write in verbs instead of adjectives." Repetitions of certain lines or phrases in the story narrative (what Palahniuk refers to as "choruses") are one of the most common characteristics of his writing style, being dispersed within most chapters of his novels. Palahniuk has said that there also are some choruses between novels, noting that the color cornflower blue and the city of Missoula, Montana appear in many of his novels. The characters in Palahniuk's stories often break into philosophical asides (either by the narrator to the reader, or spoken to the narrator through dialogue), offering numerous odd theories and opinions, often misanthropic or darkly absurdist in nature, on complex issues such as death, morality, childhood, parenthood, sexuality, and a deity. Other concepts borrowed from Spanbauer include the avoidance of "received text" (clichéd phrases or wording) and use of "burnt tongue" (intentionally odd wording).

Palahniuk does intensive rewrites of his drafts. In an interview with Jason Tanamor, he said, "It’s pathetic how much I rewrite. I’ll rework every scene a hundred times before my agent sees it. Then rework it a dozen times before my editor sees it. Then rework it all - almost beyond recognition - before it goes to the copy editor. My first draft is almost a bare-bones outline, fleshed out with every subsequent pass through. I’ll “test” the scenes in workshop and with friends, then revise them based on audience reaction and feedback. The only time a book is “done” is when the type is set. By then I'm in love with a new idea, so the old one is officially finished."

Themes
Palahniuk's writing often contains anti-consumerist themes. Writing about Fight Club, Paul Kennett argues that because the Narrator's fights with Tyler Durden are fights with himself, and because he fights himself in front of his boss at the hotel, the Narrator is using the fights as a way of asserting himself as his own boss. These fights are a representation of the struggle of the proletarian at the hands of a higher capitalist power; by asserting himself as capable of having the same power he thus becomes his own master. Later when fight club is formed, the participants are all dressed and groomed similarly, allowing them to symbolically fight themselves at the club and gain the same power. In an interview with HuffPost, Palahniuk says that "the central message of Fight Club was always about the empowerment of the individual through small, escalating challenges."

Reception and criticism
The content of Palahniuk's works has been described as nihilistic. Palahniuk has rejected this label, stating that he is a romantic, and that his works are mistakenly seen as nihilistic because they express ideas that others do not believe in.

Personal life
As an adult, Palahniuk became a member of the rebellious Cacophony Society. He is a regular participant in their events, including the annual Santa Rampage (a public Christmas party involving pranks and drunkenness) in Portland, Oregon. His participation in the Society inspired some of the events in his writings, both fictional and non-fictional. 

Palahniuk came out as gay after an interview with Karen Valby, a reporter for Entertainment Weekly. Believing that he would be "outed" by Valby after confidentially referring to his male partner, he openly declared his homosexuality on his website. According to an interview with The Advocate in May 2008, he and his unnamed male partner live in a former church compound outside Vancouver, Washington. He and his partner have been together since the 1990s, having met while Palahniuk was working at Freightliner. He told one interviewer, "We both had these very blue-collar lives, and now our lives are completely different."

Awards
Palahniuk has won the following awards:
 1997 Pacific Northwest Booksellers Association Award (for Fight Club)
 1997 Oregon Book Award for Best Novel (for Fight Club)
 2003 Pacific Northwest Booksellers Association Award (for Lullaby)

He was nominated for the 1999 Oregon Book Award for Best Novel for Survivor and for the Bram Stoker Award for Best Novel for Lullaby in 2002 and for Haunted in 2005.

Bibliography

Fiction
 Fight Club (1996)
 Survivor (1999)
 Invisible Monsters (1999)
 Choke (2001)
 Lullaby (2002)
 Diary (2003)
 Haunted (2005)
 Rant (2007)
 Snuff (2008)
 Pygmy (2009)
 Tell-All (2010)
 Damned (2011)
 Invisible Monsters Remix (2012)
 Doomed (2013)
 Burnt Tongues (2014) (editor)
 Beautiful You (2014)
 Make Something Up (2015)
 Fight Club 2 (2015–16) (graphic novel with Cameron Stewart)
 Bait: Off-Color Stories for You to Color (2016)
 Legacy: An Off-Color Novella for You to Color (2017)
 Adjustment Day (2018)
 Fight Club 3 (2019) (graphic novel with Cameron Stewart)
 The Invention of Sound (2020)

Short fiction
 "Negative Reinforcement" in Modern Short Stories (1990)
 "The Love Theme of Sybil and William" in Modern Short Stories (1990)
 "Insiders" in Best Life (2007)
 "Mister Elegant" in VICE (2007)
 "Fetch" in Dark Delicacies III (2009)
 "Loser" in Stories (2010)
 "Knock, Knock" in Playboy (2010)
 "Romance" in Playboy (2011)
 "Phoenix" (2013)
 "Cannibal" in Playboy (2013)
 "Zombie" in Playboy (2013)
 "Let's See What Happens" in Nightmare Magazine, Issue 37 (2015)
 "One Day You'll Thank Me" in Fangoria, Volume 2, Issue 1 (2018)
 "Unlawful Entry" in Playboy (2018)
 "Repercussions" in Playboy (2019)

Non-fiction
 Fugitives and Refugees: A Walk in Portland, Oregon (2003)
 Stranger than Fiction: True Stories (2004)
 You Do Not Talk About Fight Club: I Am Jack's Completely Unauthorized Essay Collection (2008) (introduction)
 Consider This: Moments In My Writing Life After Which Everything Was Different (2020)

Films
 Fight Club (1999) (feature based on the novel)
 Choke (2008) (feature based on the novel)
 Romance (2012) (short based on the short story)
 Lullaby (TBD) (feature based on the novel)
 Rant (TBD) (feature based on the novel)

Scholarship
 Francisco Collado-Rodriguez, editor, (2013) Chuck Palahniuk: Fight Club, Invisible Monsters, Choke. London, UK: Bloomsbury.
Douglas Keesey (2016) Understanding Chuck Palahniuk. Columbia, SC: The University of South Carolina Press.
Cynthia Kuhn and Lance Rubin, editors, (2009) Reading Chuck Palahniuk: American Monsters and Literary Mayhem. New York, NY: Routledge.
 David McCracken (2016) Chuck Palahniuk, Parodist: Postmodern Irony in Six Transgressive Novels. Jefferson, NC: McFarland & Company, Inc.
Jeffrey A. Sartain, editor, (2009) Sacred and Immoral: On the Writings of Chuck Palahniuk. Newcastle upon Tyne, UK: Cambridge Scholars Publishing.
Read Mercer Schuchardt, editor (2008) You Do Not Talk About Fight Club: I Am Jack's Completely Unauthorized Essay Collection. Dallas, TX: Benbella Books.
Massimo Bracci, Una guida filosofica a Fight club di Palahniuk, Ed. Luna, Macerata (IT), 2022

See also

 List of American novelists
 List of LGBT people from Portland, Oregon

Notes

External links

 
 

1962 births
Living people
20th-century American novelists
21st-century American novelists
Anti-consumerists
American horror writers
American male journalists
American male novelists
American people of French descent
American people of Ukrainian descent
American people of Polish descent
American satirists
Cacophony Society
American gay writers
American LGBT journalists
American LGBT novelists
LGBT people from Washington (state)
Minimalist writers
University of Oregon alumni
Novelists from Oregon
Writers from Pasco, Washington
Obscenity controversies in literature
Writers from Vancouver, Washington
Novelists from Washington (state)
21st-century American non-fiction writers
20th-century American non-fiction writers
20th-century American male writers
21st-century American male writers